The military doctrine of Ukrainian nationalists is a book of the military theorist of the OUN, commander of the armed forces of the Carpatho-Ukraine, colonel M. F. Kolodzynsky.

Content 
The book consists of three parts:
 the first part concerns history and politics;
 the second part is a review of the borders of Ukraine;
 the third part discusses the strategy of the Ukrainian liberation war.
The content of the book is replete with calls for anti-Jewish pogroms and vandalism.

Literature 
 Колодзінський М. Ф. «Воєнна доктрина українських націоналістів». Видавництво: «Основа», Київ, 2019. . 
 Balázs Trencsényi, Michal Kopeček, Luka Lisjak Gabrijelčič, Maria Falina, Mónika Baár, Maciej Janowski. A History of Modern Political Thought in East Central Europe: Volume II... Oxford University Press, 2018. .

References

External links 
 Organization of ukrainian nationalists, CIA
 The ukrainian libertation movement, CIA

1940 non-fiction books
1957 non-fiction books
Organization of Ukrainian Nationalists
Antisemitic publications
Historical negationism
Propaganda books and pamphlets
Ukrainian books
Ukrainian-language books
Right-wing antisemitism